Marc Josef Elizalde (born May 28, 1990) is a Filipino actor who was a housemate on Pinoy Big Brother: Teen Edition Plus with Robi Domingo, his rival at that time.

Personal life 

Marc Josef Elizalde was born to Butch Elizalde and Marinez Carvajal. Butch is a member of rock band "Route 70" while Marinez is the talent manager of fellow actor Jericho Rosales. His family is from the prominent Elizalde clan of Pampanga. He was formerly linked to fellow PBB housemate Nicole Uysiuseng.

Showbiz career 

He gained prominence when he joined Pinoy Big Brother in 2008. Fellow housemates from this batch included Robi Domingo and Beauty Gonzales. After getting eliminated, he was cast in multiple television shows until making a breakthrough role as a gay character in Angelito: Batang Ama. He was previously cast in the longtime running crime/drama series FPJ's Ang Probinsyano.

Filmography

Television

Film

References

External links

Living people
Pinoy Big Brother contestants
Filipino male film actors
1990 births
Star Magic
Viva Artists Agency
Filipino male television actors